Edward "Pat" Deisel (April 29, 1876 in Ripley, Ohio – April 17, 1948 in Cincinnati), was a professional baseball player who played catcher for the 1902 Brooklyn Superbas and the 1903 Cincinnati Reds. He appeared in a total of three games in the major leagues during his short career.

External links

1876 births
1948 deaths
Major League Baseball catchers
Brooklyn Superbas players
Cincinnati Reds players
Baseball players from Ohio
Kenton Babes players
People from Ripley, Ohio